Destroy Me, Lover is the fourth studio album by American noise rock and Industrial music band Pain Teens, released on July 5, 1993 by Trance Syndicate.

Reception

Jason Ankeny of allmusic gave it 2 out of 5 stars, expressing his dislike for Scott Ayers' compositional style and calling Bliss Blood's contributions "negligible at best".

The album cover features an image appropriated from the first edition of William S. Burroughs's novel Junkie, published by Ace Books.

Track listing

Personnel
Adapted from the Destroy Me, Lover liner notes.
Pain Teens
Scott Ayers – guitar, drums, sampler, electronics, tape, production, engineering, recording
Bliss Blood – lead vocals, percussion
Kirk Carr – bass guitar
Frank Garymartin – drums, percussion

Release history

References

External links 
 Destroy Me, Lover at Bandcamp
 

1993 albums
Pain Teens albums
Albums produced by Scott Ayers
Trance Syndicate albums